Gap Queens Park Football Club was a Welsh association football club based in Wrexham. Their home ground was Queensway Stadium. Formed as Queens Park F.C. in 1988, the club nearly went out of business in 2007 after finishing bottom of the Cymru Alliance. They were subsequently taken over by new owners including recruitment firm Gap Personnel and rebranded as Gap Queens Park, playing in the company colours of all white with navy and maroon trim. After one season under their new identity, the club folded in 2008.

References

Defunct football clubs in Wales
Association football clubs established in 1988
Association football clubs disestablished in 2008
1988 establishments in Wales
2008 disestablishments in Wales
Football clubs in Wrexham
Cymru Alliance clubs